The Listening Pool was an English band, founded by three former members of Orchestral Manoeuvres in the Dark (OMD), after the original-lineup split in 1989. It was composed of Paul Humphreys, Malcolm Holmes and Martin Cooper.

The group released one album, Still Life (1994).

History

Name
Martin Cooper on how they came up with the band's name from an interview in the Telegraph fanzine:

Paul Humphreys:

Contractual difficulties
The Listening Pool had to overcome a few obstacles before they could release their CD. The Listening Pool could not release any music since Paul Humphreys and Andy McCluskey signed an agreement releasing Paul from his contract with Virgin Records while allowing Andy to continue using the name OMD. Until new OMD material was issued, nothing could be done on Paul's end.

Martin states in the Telegraph interview:

The Listening Pool originally signed with a record label called Inevitable, which later folded. The Listening Pool then formed their own independent label, Telegraph Records. OMD used the fictitious "Telegraph" label for Dazzle Ships (1983), to maintain the image of being signed to an "indie" label.

Debut album
The Listening Pool released its debut album titled Still Life in 1994. The style of Still Life is quite a change from the electronic sound of the OMD of old using the individual talents of the members with more acoustic drums, saxophone and keyboards.

Split
In 1996, after recording some songs intended for a follow-up album, one of which was titled "Satellite" the band split. Paul Humphreys went on to form the band Onetwo with Claudia Brucken, Martin Cooper resumed his painting career and Mal Holmes continued to work in the music industry.

In 2006 the classic OMD line-up of McCluskey, Humphreys, Cooper, and Holmes reunited, and continued to tour and record.

Discography

Album
Still Life (1994)
 "Meant To Be" – 4:15
 "Oil for the Lamps of China" – 3:34
 "Follow Where You Go" – 3:54
 "Breathless" – 4:17
 "Somebody Somewhere" (with Paul Roberts) – 4:03
 "Photograph of You" (with Simon Dutton) – 4:17
 "Promised the World" – 4:28
 "Blue Africa" – 4:33
 "Still Life" – 4:34
 "Where Do We Go from Here" – 3:33
 "Wild Strawberries" (with Thomas Lang) – 3:55
 "Hand Me That Universe" – 2:11

Reception

Michael Sutton of AllMusic wrote, "The Listening Pool's jazzy, laid-back grooves on Still Life have more in common with the lush, romantic pop of China Crisis, the Blue Nile, and Roxy Music... The songs are magnificent, refreshingly moving beyond OMD's limited canvas." Trouser Press stated, "The Listening Pool crafts a pleasant, organic sound as akin to later Talk Talk or China Crisis as OMD. Highlighted by the fine single 'Oil for the Lamps of China', Still Life is worthwhile for hardcore OMD-ers." P.F. Wilson of City Pages wrote that the band "made a great album, but it's kind of hard to find".

Singles
Oil for the Lamps of China (1993)
CD single
 "Oil for the Lamps of China" – 3:34
 "Where Do We Go From Here" – 3:34
 "Oil for the Lamps of China (Extended Version)" – 6:02
 "Oil for the Lamps of China (Instrumental)" – 3:30
12" single
 "Oil for the Lamps of China (Extended Version)" – 6:00
 "Oil for the Lamps of China (Single Mix)" – 3:30
 "Where Do We Go From Here" – 3:34
Cassette single
 "Oil for the Lamps of China" – 3:34
 "Where Do We Go From Here" – 3:34
 "Oil for the Lamps of China (Extended Version)" – 6:02
 "Oil for the Lamps of China (Instrumental)" – 3:30
Meant To Be (1995)
CD Single
 "Meant To Be" – 4:15
 "Meant To Be (Extended Version)" – 6:42
 "Meant To Be (Instrumental)" – 4:18

Telegraph records
The Listening Pool formed their own independent label, Telegraph Records. Besides releasing their own work, they also signed artists like Peter Coyle (both as a solo artist and as part of Pure Journey) and China Crisis. The label was short lived resulting in a brief catalogue.

Releases

References

English pop music groups
English new wave musical groups
Musical groups established in 1989
Musical groups disestablished in 1996
Musical groups from Merseyside
British musical trios